Compsoctena reductella is a moth in the family Eriocottidae. It was described by Francis Walker in 1863. It is found in Nepal and India.

References

Moths described in 1863
Compsoctena
Moths of Asia